Scott Hatch is an American lobbyist working with Walker, Martin & Hatch LLC, a lobbying firm based in Washington. Because he is the son of Utah Senator Orrin Hatch, people have criticized his current position due to his being a "lawmaker's kid".

He is active in the powerlifting community, and sports a 1200 pound total.

References

Year of birth missing (living people)
Living people
American lobbyists